Juozas Žemaitis, M.I.C., (30 August 1926 – 5 October 2021) was a Lithuanian Roman Catholic prelate and member of the Congregation of Marian Fathers of the Immaculate Conception. He served as the Bishop of the Roman Catholic Diocese of Vilkaviškis from 1991 until his retirement in October 2002.

Žemaitis was born on 30 August 1926 in Sparviniai, Šakiai District Municipality, Lithuania. He was ordained as a Catholic priest on 25 September 1949.

Bishop emeritus Juozas Žemaitis died in Marijampolė, Lithuania. on 5 October 2021, at the age of 95. He was buried in the crypt of St. Michael the Archangel Roman Catholic Cathedral in Marijampolė on 8 October 2021.

References

1926 births
2021 deaths
Lithuanian Roman Catholic bishops
Recipients of the Order of the Lithuanian Grand Duke Gediminas
Congregation of Marian Fathers of the Immaculate Conception
Bishops appointed by Pope John Paul II
People from Marijampolė